The High School Affiliated to Beijing Normal University (BJSDFZ) is a high school affiliated with Beijing Normal University located in Xicheng District, Beijing. Founded in 1901 as China's first public high school, it is ranked among the most prestigious and elite high schools in the country.

History 
BJSDFZ was founded on November 2, 1901.(五成学堂, wucheng xuetang)

BJSDFZ is one of the oldest public modern secondary schools in China.

The High School affiliated to Beijing Normal University was formerly known as Wucheng School (五城学堂). In Qing Dynasty, the capital Beiping (former Beijing) was divided into five cities: East, west, north, south and middle city. The name Wucheng School means "five cities school." In 1908, the school was divided into two school, Wucheng School and Superior Normal School. In 1912, Superior Normal School was changed into Beijing Higher Normal School, and Wucheng School was changed into the Affiliated Middle School of Beijing Higher Normal School. 

In 1921, a women's department was added, which was the beginning of coeducation in middle schools in Beijing. In 1923, with the upgrading of Beijing Higher Normal School to Beijing Normal University, Wucheng Middle School became the affiliated middle school of Beijing Normal University. It became the first public middle school in China.

In the following decades, the High School affiliated to Beijing Normal University changed its name several times. 1977 Beijing Municipal Committee approved the restoration of the original name Beijing Normal University Affiliated High School.

Campuses 
One on each side of Nanxinhua street, students under grade 12 study on the east campus, students in grade 12 study on the west campus.

From 2018, students in grade 7 study in the campus which used to be Hepingmen high school.

Alumni

Qian Xuesen 
Qian Xuesen (December 11, 1911—October 31, 2009), born in Shanghai, was an applied mechanic, aerospace technology and systems engineer, member of the Faculty of the Chinese Academy of Sciences, academician of the Chinese Academy of Engineering, winner of the “Two Bombs, One Satellite” Merit Medal. He was a senior advisor to the Science and Technology Commission of the General Armaments Department of the Chinese People's Liberation Army.

Qian studied at the High School Affiliated to Beijing Normal University in 1923 and graduated in 1926. In 1929, Qian Xuesen studied at the Department of Mechanical Engineering in Shanghai Jiao Tong University from 1929 to 1934. In 1939, he received his Ph. D. degree in Aeronautics and mathematics from California Institute of Technology. In 1946, he became an associate professor in Department of Aeronautical Engineering. One year later, he became a professor of Aerodynamics.

Zhao Shiyan 
Zhao Shiyan was an early proletarian revolutionary of the Chinese Communist Party, a disseminator of Marxism theory, a leader of the labor movement, and one of the founders of the Chinese Communist Party.

In 1915, Zhao Shiyan was admitted to the Affiliated High School of Beijing Higher Normal School. He had participated in the famous "May 4th Movement" and was the organizer of the student movement of the High School Affiliated to Beijing Normal University. In 1920, he went to France for work-study and founded the European Branch of the Chinese Communist Party together with Zhou Enlai and others. After returning to China, Zhao Shiyan led three strikes in Shanghai and became a famous leader of the labor movement. He was arrested and killed in 1927.

Teachers 
BJSDFZ has 17 "Supreme teachers"(特级教师, teji jiaoshi), over 50% are "High-level teachers".

Academics 
In recent 100 years, many students who graduated from BJSDFZ, became distinguished professors

100% of the graduate go to colleges. During 2005–2015, thousands of students went to top colleges in the mainland, hundreds of students went to famous colleges overseas.

Clubs 
BJSDFZ Robot club entered “First Global” Robotics Challenge in 2018, and won Fourth place.

BJSDFZ MUN club won the "Best Statement" (最佳立场文件奖, zuijia lichangwenjian jiang) and "Best Demeanor" (最佳风采奖, zuijia fengcai jiang) in PKUNMUN2019.

Motto 
诚(cheng), 爱(ai), 勤(qin), 勇(yong)(Truthfulness, Dedication, Diligence and Courageousness)

See also 

 List of schools in Xicheng District

References

External links
The High School Affiliated to Beijing Normal University /

Beijing Normal University
Schools in Xicheng District
Beijing Normal University
High schools in Beijing